In enzymology, a saccharopine dehydrogenase (NAD+, L-glutamate-forming) is an enzyme that catalyzes the chemical reaction

N6-(L-1,3-dicarboxypropyl)-L-lysine + NAD+ + H2O  L-glutamate + 2-aminoadipate 6-semialdehyde + NADH + H+

The 3 substrates of this enzyme are N6-(L-1,3-dicarboxypropyl)-L-lysine, NAD+, and H2O, whereas its 4 products are L-glutamate, 2-aminoadipate 6-semialdehyde, NADH, and H+.

This enzyme belongs to the family of oxidoreductases, specifically those acting on the CH-NH group of donors with NAD+ or NADP+ as acceptor.  The systematic name of this enzyme class is N6-(L-1,3-dicarboxypropyl)-L-lysine:NAD+ oxidoreductase (L-glutamate-forming). Other names in common use include dehydrogenase, saccharopine (nicotinamide adenine dinucleotide,, glutamate-forming), saccharopin dehydrogenase, NAD+ oxidoreductase (L-2-aminoadipic-delta-semialdehyde and, glutamate forming), aminoadipic semialdehyde synthase, saccharopine dehydrogenase (NAD+, L-glutamate-forming), 6-N-(L-1,3-dicarboxypropyl)-L-lysine:NAD+ oxidoreductase, and (L-glutamate-forming).  This enzyme participates in lysine degradation.

References

 
 

EC 1.5.1
NADH-dependent enzymes
Enzymes of unknown structure